The 1978 Colgate Red Raiders football team was an American football team that represented Colgate University as an independent during the 1978 NCAA Division I-A football season. In its third season under head coach Frederick Dunlap, the team compiled a 3–8 record. Doug Curtis and Dick Slenker were the team captains. 

The team played its home games at Andy Kerr Stadium in Hamilton, New York.

Schedule

Leading players 
Three trophies were awarded to the Red Raiders' most valuable players in 1978: 
 Bruce Nardella, center, received the Andy Kerr Trophy, awarded to the most valuable offensive player.
 Two players received the Hal W. Lahar Trophy, awarded to the most valuable defensive player: Ray Linn, defensive tackle, and Tom McGarrity, defensive back.

Statistical leaders for the 1978 Red Raiders included: 
 Rushing: Angelo Colosimo, 792 yards and 9 touchdowns on 205 attempts
 Passing: John Marzo, 1,337 yards, 100 completions and 6 touchdowns on 209 attempts
 Receiving: Two receivers with 36 catches, Dick Slenker (527 yards, 3 touchdowns) and Angelo Colosimo (326 yards, 2 touchdowns)
 Total offense: John Marzo, 1,515 yards (1,337 passing, 178 rushing)
 Scoring: Angelo Colosimo, 68 points from 11 touchdowns and 1 two-point conversion
 All-purpose yards: Angelo Colosimo, 1,127 yards (792 rushing, 326 receiving, 9 kickoff returning)
 Tackles: Doug Curtis, 190 total tackles
 Sacks: Ray Linn, 4 quarterback sacks

References

Colgate
Colgate Raiders football seasons
Colgate Red Raiders football